Kingsley Asiam (1921-1982) was a Ghanaian politician in first republic. He was the member of parliament for the Akwapim South constituency from 1954 to 1965 and the member of parliament for the Akropong constituency from 1965 to 1966. Prior to entering parliament he was the Intelligence Officer for the Cocoa Purchasing Company.

Early life and education
Asiam was born in 1921. He was educated at the Accra Methodist School.

Career and politics
Asiam begun as a cocoa contractor prior to joining the Convention People's Party in 1949. In 1951, he became the Eastern Regional Chairman of the party and later, a national executive of the party. Within that period, he doubled as an Intelligence Officer for the Cocoa Purchasing Company. In 1954 he was elected to represent the Akwapim South electoral area in the national assembly (parliament). He was re-elected in 1956 and remained in this position until 1965 when he became the member of parliament for the Akropong constituency. He remained in parliament until 1966 when the Nkrumah government was overthrown.

See also
 List of MLAs elected in the 1954 Gold Coast legislative election
 List of MLAs elected in the 1956 Gold Coast legislative election
 List of MPs elected in the 1965 Ghanaian parliamentary election

References

1921 births
Ghanaian MPs 1954–1956
Ghanaian MPs 1956–1965
Ghanaian MPs 1965–1966
20th-century Ghanaian politicians
1982 deaths